Jean-Baptiste Dugas-Montbel (1776–1834) was a French translator.

1776 births
1834 deaths
People from Saint-Chamond
French translators
Hellenists
Alumni of Oratorian schools
Burials at Père Lachaise Cemetery
French male writers